Parapontixanthobacter aurantiacus is a Gram-negative and aerobic bacterium from the genus of Parapontixanthobacter which has been isolated from deep-sea sediments from the Pacific Ocean.

References 

Sphingomonadales
Bacteria described in 2016